Ariadne was a figure in Greek mythology. 

Ariadne may also refer to:

Arts and entertainment

Fictional characters
Ariadne Oliver, a fictional character in the novels of Agatha Christie
Ariadne the spider, a character in the British children's animated TV series Creepy Crawlies
Ariadne, a character in the film Inception
Ariadne, a character in the Korean manhwa Ares
Ariadne, a character from British TV series Atlantis

Other uses in arts and entertainment
Ariadne (EP), a 2004 extended play released by The Clientele
Ariadne (poem), a 1932 epic by F. L. Lucas
Ariadne auf Naxos, an opera by Richard Strauss
Ariadne musica, a collection of organ music by Johann Caspar Ferdinand Fischer
Sleeping Ariadne, a Roman sculpture in the Vatican Museums
Ariadne: A Social Art Network, a collaborative art group founded by Suzanne Lacy and Leslie Labowitz-Starus
"Ariadne", an episode of the 2019 TV series Russian Doll

People
Ariadne (empress), a Byzantine Empress from the late 5th century
Ariadne of Phrygia, Christian saint 
Ariadne Getty (born 1962), American philanthropist
Ariadne Welter (1930–1998), Mexican actress

Taxonomy
Ariadne (butterfly), a genus of nymphalid butterflies
Ariadne, a genus of flowering plants, synonym of Mazaea
Scinax ariadne, a species of frog endemic to Brazil

Other uses
Ariadne (archive), the department of the Austrian National Library devoted to women's and gender studies
Ariadne (psychedelic), a psychedelic drug
, the name of several ships
Ariadne (software), an Educational Content Management System
Ariadne (web magazine), an Information Sciences journal published by Loughborough University
Ariadne's thread (logic), an algorithm in puzzle-solving
43 Ariadne, the second-largest member of the Flora asteroid family
Ariadne, name in Greece for the January 2017 European cold wave
 Ariadne (crater), a crater on Venus

See also

Ariadna (disambiguation)
Ariana (disambiguation)
Ariane (disambiguation)
Arianna (disambiguation)
Aryana (disambiguation)

Genus disambiguation pages